Prinsloo is an Afrikaans surname. The name is derived from the Dutch word Prins (meaning prince), and a Loo suffix meaning clearing in a forest. Variant spellings include Prinzloo and Prinslo.

It can refer to:

 Behati Prinsloo (born 1989), Namibian model
 Boom Prinsloo (born 1989), South African rugby player
 Christine Prinsloo (born 1952), Zimbabwean hockey player
 Hanli Prinsloo, South African freediver and ocean conservationist
 Gouws Prinsloo (born 1990), South African rugby player
 Hendrik Fredrik Prinsloo (1890–1966), South African colonel
 Henno Prinsloo (born 1987), Namibian cricketer
 Jan Prinsloo (born 1935), South African rugby union and rugby league footballer
 Karin Prinsloo (born 1972), South African martial artist
 Karin Prinsloo (born 1989), South African swimmer
 Louise Prinsloo (born 1946), South African author and radio script writer
 Marthinus Prinsloo (1838-1903), Orange Free State farmer, politician and commander-in-chief in the Second Boer War
 Maureen Prinsloo ( 1995–1998), Canadian politician
 P. J. Prinsloo (born 1978), South African actor
 Rudi Prinsloo, South African rugby league player
 Sandra Prinsloo (born 1947), South African actress
 Troyden Prinsloo (born 1985), South African swimmer

References

Afrikaans-language surnames
Surnames of Dutch origin